Megacraspedus isotis is a moth of the family Gelechiidae. It was described by Edward Meyrick in 1904. It is found in Australia, where it has been recorded from Western Australia.

The forewings are grey, sprinkled with whitish. The hindwings are grey.

References

Moths described in 1904
Megacraspedus